Krishna Kumar is the name of:
 Kumar Krishna (1928–2014), American entomologist
 R. K. Krishna Kumar (1938–2023), Indian business executive
 C. P. Krishnakumar (born 1939), Indian Kannada writer
 P. R. Krishna Kumar (1951–2020), Indian physician
 V. P. Krishnakumar (born 1958), Indian sound recordist
 Krishna Kumar (actor) (born 1968), Tamil and Malayalam actor
 Krishna Kumar (chemist) (born 1970), chemistry professor at Tufts University
 K (composer) (born 1987), stage name of Indian composer Krishna Kumar
 Krishna Kumar (cricketer) (born 1991), Indian cricketer